Ruth Pershing Uhler (1895-1967) was an American painter, teacher and curator. She was the first curator of education at the Museum of Fine Arts, Houston from 1941 to 1967. One of her paintings, Earth Rhythms, is at the Dallas Museum of Art.

References

1895 births
1967 deaths
American women painters
Painters from Pennsylvania
Painters from Texas
People from Houston
20th-century American painters
20th-century American women artists